Gerhard Böhmer (born 8 June 1958) is a German luger. He competed in the men's singles event at the 1980 Winter Olympics.

References

1958 births
Living people
German male lugers
Olympic lugers of West Germany
Lugers at the 1980 Winter Olympics
People from Berchtesgaden
Sportspeople from Upper Bavaria